The Rural Municipality of Turtle River No. 469 is a rural municipality (RM) in the Canadian province of Saskatchewan within Census Division No. 17 and  Division No. 6.

History 
The RM of Turtle River No. 469 incorporated as a rural municipality on December 9, 1912. The RM's name is taken from the Turtle River, which outlets from Turtle Lake and drains into the North Saskatchewan River near the Michaud Islands, across the river from Delmas.

Geography

Communities and localities 
The following urban municipalities are surrounded by the RM.

Villages
 Edam

The following unincorporated communities are within the RM.

Localities
 Dulwich
 St. Hippolyte
 Vawn

Demographics 

Attractions 
 Washbrook Museum

Government 
The RM of Turtle River No. 469 is governed by an elected municipal council and an appointed administrator that meets on the second Wednesday of every month. The reeve of the RM is Louis McCaffrey while its administrator is Rebecca Carr. The RM's office is located in Edam.

Transportation 
 Saskatchewan Highway 26 (parallels the North Saskatchewan River through much of the RM)
 Saskatchewan Highway 674
 Saskatchewan Highway 769
 Canadian National Railway
 Paynton Ferry
 Edam Airport

See also 
List of rural municipalities in Saskatchewan

References

External links 

Turtle River
Division No. 17, Saskatchewan